Fort Wayne Fever was an American women's soccer team, founded in 2004. The team was a member of the United Soccer Leagues USL W-League, the second tier of women's soccer in the United States and Canada. The team plays in the Midwest Division of the Central Conference. The team folded after the 2009 season.

The team played its home games at Hefner Stadium in Fort Wayne, Indiana. The team's colors was white and black.

The team was a sister organization of the men's Fort Wayne Fever team, which plays in the USL Premier Development League.

Players

Squad 2009

Former players

Year-by-year

External links
 Fort Wayne Fever

Women's soccer clubs in Indiana
Defunct USL W-League (1995–2015) teams
2004 establishments in Indiana
2009 disestablishments in Indiana
Association football clubs established in 2004
Association football clubs disestablished in 2009